George William Russell (10 April 1867 – 17 July 1935), who wrote with the pseudonym Æ (often written AE or A.E.), was an Irish writer, editor, critic, poet, painter and Irish nationalist. He was also a writer on mysticism, and a central figure in the group of devotees of theosophy which met in Dublin for many years.

Early life
Russell was born in Lurgan, County Armagh (not in Portadown as has sometimes been misreported), in Ireland, the second son of Thomas Russell and Mary Armstrong. His father, the son of a small farmer, became an employee of Thomas Bell and Co., a prosperous firm of linen drapers. The family relocated to Dublin, where his father had a new offer of employment, when George was eleven years old. The death of his beloved sister Mary, aged 18, was a blow from which it took him a long time to recover.

He was educated at Rathmines School and the Metropolitan School of Art, where he began a lifelong, if sometimes contentious, friendship with W. B. Yeats. In the 1880s, Russell lived at the Theosophical Society lodge at 3, Upper Ely Place, sharing rooms with H. M. Magee, the brother of William Kirkpatrick Magee.

Russell started working as a draper's clerk, then for many years worked for the Irish Agricultural Organisation Society (IAOS), an agricultural co-operative society initiated by Horace Plunkett in 1894. In 1897, Plunkett needed an able organiser and W. B. Yeats suggested Russell, who became Assistant Secretary of the IAOS.

Family
In 1898, he married Violet North; they had two surviving sons, Brian and Diarmuid, as well as a third son who died soon after birth. Frank O'Connor, who was a close friend of Russell in their later years, remarked that his family life was something of a mystery even to those who knew him best: O'Connor noticed that he never spoke about his wife and seemed to be at odds with his sons (although O'Connor himself liked both of them). While his marriage was rumoured to be unhappy, all his friends agreed that Violet's death in 1932 was a great blow to Russell.

Politician

He was an able lieutenant to Plunkett, and travelled extensively throughout Ireland as a spokesman for the IAOS; he was mainly responsible for developing the credit societies and establishing Co-operative Banks in the south and west of the country, the numbers of which increased to 234 by 1910. Russell and Plunkett made a good team, with each gaining much from the association with the other. 

As an officer of the IAOS, he could not express political opinions freely, but made no secret of the fact that he considered himself a Nationalist. During the 1913 Dublin Lock-out he wrote an open letter to the Irish Times criticizing the attitude of the employers, then spoke on it in England, which purportedly helped bring the crisis to an end.

Russell definitely sympathized with the Easter Rising and saw it as in line with his views on Goidelic Nationalist "traditional and natural communism", but due to his personal leanings toward pacifism, his individual involvement took the form of editing and writing rather than direct participation in the significantly violent activities that took place. 

He was an independent delegate to the 1917–18 Irish Convention in which he opposed John Redmond's compromise on Home Rule. He became involved in the anti-partition Irish Dominion League when Plunkett founded the body in 1919.

Publisher
Russell was editor (from 1905-23) of the Irish Homestead, the journal of the IAOS. His gifts as a writer and publicist gained him a wide influence on the cause of agricultural cooperation. He then became editor of The Irish Statesman, the paper of the Irish Dominion League, which merged with the Irish Homestead, from 15 September 1923 until 12 April 1930. 

With the demise of this newspaper, he was for the first time in his adult life without a job, and there were concerns that he could find himself in a state of poverty, as he had never earned very much money from his paintings or books. At one  point his son Diarmuid was reduced to selling off early drafts of his  father's works to raise money, to the annoyance of Russell, who accused the lad, with whom his relations were not good, of "raiding the wastepaper baskets".  

Unbeknownst to him meetings and collections were organized and later that year at Plunkett House he was presented by Father T. Finlay with a cheque for £800. This enabled him to visit the United States the next year, where he was well received all over the country and his books sold in large numbers.

He used the pseudonym "AE", or more properly, "Æ". This derived from an earlier Æon signifying the lifelong quest of man, subsequently abbreviated.

Writer, artist, patron

His first book of poems, Homeward: Songs by the Way (1894), established him in what was known as the Irish Literary Revival, where Æ met the young James Joyce in 1902 and introduced him to other Irish literary figures, including William Butler Yeats. He appears as a character in the "Scylla and Charybdis" episode of Joyce's Ulysses, where he dismisses Stephen's theories on Shakespeare. Dedalus borrows money from him and then remarks: "A.E.I.O.U." His collected poems were published in 1913, with a second edition in 1926. 

He designed the famous Starry Plough flag for the Irish Citizen Army which was unveiled on 5 April 1914 and flown during the Easter Rising. 

His house at 17 Rathgar Avenue in Dublin became a meeting-place at the time for everyone interested in the economic and artistic future of Ireland: his Sunday evenings "at home" were a notable feature of Dublin literary life. Michael Collins, the effective leader of the new Government, became acquainted with Russell in the last months of his life: Oliver St. John Gogarty, a regular guest at Russell's Sundays "at home" believed that these two men, so utterly unalike in most ways, nonetheless developed a deep mutual respect.

Russell's generosity and hospitality were legendary: Frank O'Connor fondly recalled "the warmth and kindness, which enfolded you like an old fur coat". He was the most loyal of friends, and in the notoriously fractious Dublin literary world Russell tried to keep the peace between his endlessly quarrelling colleagues: even the abrasive Seamus O'Sullivan could be forgiven a great deal, simply because "Seamus drinks too much". His interests were wide-ranging; he became a theosophist and wrote extensively on politics and economics, while continuing to paint and write poetry. Æ claimed to be a clairvoyant, able to view various kinds of spiritual beings, which he illustrated in paintings and drawings.

He was noted for his exceptional kindness and generosity towards younger writers: Frank O'Connor termed him "the man who was the father to three generations of Irish writers", and Patrick Kavanagh called him "a great and holy man". P. L. Travers, famous as the creator of Mary Poppins, was yet another writer who gratefully recalled Russell's help and encouragement. He features, scandalously, in Chapter 13 of Anthony Burgess' novel Earthly Powers.

Last years and death
Russell, who had become increasingly unhappy in the Irish Free State (which according to Yeats he called "a country given over to the Devil"), moved to England soon after his wife's death in 1932. Despite his failing health he went on a final lecture tour in the United States, but returned home utterly exhausted. He died of cancer in Bournemouth in 1935. 

His body was brought back to Ireland and interred in Mount Jerome Cemetery, Dublin.

Poetry

Homeward Songs by the Way (Dublin: Whaley 1894)
The Earth Breath and Other Poems (NY&London: John Lane 1896)
The Nuts of Knowledge (Dublin: Dun Emer Press, 1903)
The Divine Vision and Other Poems (London: Macmillan; NY: Macmillan 1904)
By Still Waters (Dublin: Dun Emer Press 1906)
Deirdre (Dublin: Maunsel 1907)
Collected Poems (London: Macmillan 1913) (2nd. edit. 1926)
Gods of War, with Other Poems (Dublin: priv. 1915)
Imaginations and Reveries (Dublin & London: Maunsel 1915)
Candle of Vision: Autobiography of a Mystic (London: Macmillan, 1918)
Voices of the Stones (London: Macmillan, 1925)
Midsummer Eve (NY: Crosby Gaige 1928)
Enchantment and Other Poems (NY: Fountain; London: Macmillan 1930);
Vale and Other Poems (London: Macmillan 1931)
Song and Its Fountains (London: Macmillan 1932)
Verses for Friends (Dublin: Printed for the writer 1932)
The House of Titans and Other Poems (London: Macmillan 1934)
Selected Poems (London: Macmillan 1935).

Novels
The Interpreters (1922)
The Avatars (1933)

Essays
AE in the Irish Theosophist (1892–97)
The Hero In Man (The Orpheus Press 1910)
The Renewal of Youth (The Orpheus Press 1911)
Ideals of the New Rural Society, in: Horace Plunkett, Ellice Pilkington, George Russell (AE), The United Irishwomen - Their place, work and ideals. With a Preface by Rev. T. A. Finlay (Dublin: Maunsel 1911
Co-operation and Nationality: A guide for rural reformers from this to the next generation (Dublin: Maunsel 1914 )
The National Being: Some Thoughts on an Irish Polity (Dublin: Maunsel 1916)
The Candle of Vision (London: Macmillan 1918)
The Inner and the Outer Ireland ( Dublin, Talbot Press, 1921) (Pamphlet) 
Song and Its Fountains (1932)
The Living Torch (1937)

References

Sources
 Allen, Nicholas: George Russel (AE) and the New Ireland 1905–30, Four Courts Press Dublin (2003) 
William Kirkpatrick Magee, A Memoir of AE, George William Russell (1937)

External links

 Brief biography
 Chronology of Russell's life
 
 Works by George William Russell at Project Gutenberg Australia
 
 
 Russell at the Online Books Page (University of Pennsylvania)
 The Candle of Vision (1918)
 Collected Poems by Æ (1913)
 
 Index entry for A.E. at Poets' Corner
 Finding aid to Mary Louisa Sutliff papers, including Russell correspondence, at Columbia University. Rare Book & Manuscript Library.

1867 births
1935 deaths
People from Lurgan
Irish newspaper editors
Irish Dominion League
19th-century Irish painters
20th-century Irish painters
Irish male painters
Irish poets
Irish Theosophists
George William Russell
Alumni of the National College of Art and Design
People from County Dublin
Ulysses (novel) characters
Flag designers